Colewell is a 2019 American drama film written and directed by Tom Quinn and starring Karen Allen as Nora, a middle-aged woman who runs the post office of a small town.  Nora, who lives alone in the house that doubles as Colewell's post office, finds her life at a cross-roads when she learns that her contract with the United States Postal Service isn't being renewed, and postal service for Colewell will be moved to another town.  Other citizens of Colewell, concerned about their mail, also sympathize with Nora.  Nevertheless, the impending end of her career in Colewell forced Nora to confront how disconnected she is with the people she has lived with.

Cast
Karen Allen as Nora
Kevin J. O'Connor as Charles
Hannah Gross as Ella
Daniel Jenkins as Al
Craig Walker as Bob
Malachy Cleary as Gary
Catherine Kellner as Claire

Release
The film premiered at the San Francisco International Film Festival on April 13, 2019.

Reception
The film has  rating on Rotten Tomatoes.

Nick Schager of Variety gave the film a positive review and wrote that "the film’s finely crafted serenity is in keeping with its main character’s secluded state of affairs, and mind."

Stephen Farber of The Hollywood Reporter also gave the film a positive review and wrote "Although Colewell could have benefited from pruning away some of its eccentricities, it pays eloquent tribute to a woman who fights against a life erased."

Nominations
At the 35th Independent Spirit Awards, Allen was nominated for the Independent Spirit Award for Best Female Lead and the film was nominated for the Independent Spirit John Cassavetes Award.

References

External links
 
 

American drama films
2019 drama films
2010s English-language films
2010s American films